Ritona (also known as Pritona) is a Celtic goddess chiefly venerated in the land of the Treveri in what is now Germany. Her cult is attested at Pachten and at Trier, where she "had a carefully built little temple" in the Altbachtal complex. Ritona's temple was one of several in the Altbachtal to include exedrae and courtyards that may have been used to prepare ritual banquets and/or to place offerings. At Pachten her temple also had a theatre, presumably used for performances of a religious nature.

Name 
The theonym Ritona is generally interpreted as meaning 'that of the ford', stemming from the Gaulish root ritu- ('ford'; cf. Old Irish Humar-rith, Welsh rhyd 'ford'). This suggests that she was a goddess of fords; Jean-Marie Pailler remarks that, "Water crossings required religious precautions that were written into the landscape, toponymy, and ritual: Ritona is thus well at home among the 'crossers' who were the Treveri". The translation 'that of the course [of the river]' is also possible, by deriving Ritona from the homonym root ritu-, rito- ('course'; cf. Old Irish riuth, Welsh rhed 'course'), although the name Trēveri is also generally seen as meaning 'those crossing the river', that is to say the 'ferrymen'.

The variant Pritona is directly attested twice: on the goddess's only inscription at Pachten (PRITONAE DIVINAE SIVE CA[...]IONI), and in conjunction with ‘Ritona’ on an inscription from Trier (DEA RITONA PRITONA). Pritona is also restored in a further, more fragmentary inscription from Trier (RITO/[NAE] SIVE EX IV[SSV PR]/ITONI[AE?]). A single inscription also honours her at Uzès in southern France.

Role 
Lothar Schwinden characterizes Ritona as a mother goddess on the basis of the statue of a seated goddess found at Pachten, which he connects with the well-known local type of seated mother goddesses with dogs or babies on their laps (cf. Aveta).

The Pachten inscription specifies that the goddess was invoked by an individual "for the well-being of the townsfolk of Contiomagium" (PRO SALVTE / [V]IKANORVM CONTI/OMAGIENSIVM). A votive sculpture from Crain, depicting a male figure holding an offering-dish and pouring out liquid from a vessel, is dedicated to Minerva and Ritona. On two of the inscriptions from Trier, Ritona is invoked in conjunction either with the numina of the Augusti (see imperial cult) or in honour of the divine house (the imperial family).

References

Bibliography

 

Gaulish goddesses
Sea and river goddesses
Treveri